The 2019 season was Kelantan's 74th year in their history and 1st season in the Malaysia Premier League following relegation 2018 season. Along with the league, the club also participated in Malaysia FA Cup and Malaysia Challenge Cup.

Events

Pre-season
On 15 January 2019, Flávio signed a one-year contract with the club after his contract with Negeri Sembilan expired.

On 23 January 2019, Mustafa Zazai signed with the club after his contract with Phrae United expired.

On 27 January 2019, Marko Kraljević signed a two-year contract with the club as the new head coach. On 27 January 2019, Raúl Tarragona signed a contract with the club.

On 28 January 2019, David Rowley joined the club on one-year contract.

During season
On 1 April 2019, Raúl Tarragona has left the club with mutual aggreement.

On 8 April 2019, Marko Kraljević has been sacked from the club after three months with the club. Cássio, Flávio, Mustafa Zazai and Raúl Tarragona have left the club during mid season.

On 24 April 2019, Mustafa Zazai decided to leave the club.

On 14 May 2019, Flávio left the club to join Liga 1 club Bhayangkara.

On 16 May 2019, Badhri Radzi left the club on mutual aggreement.

On 18 June 2019, Kelantan Football Association President, Bibi Ramjani has resigned.

Competitions

Malaysia Premier League

Malaysia FA Cup

Malaysia Challenge Cup

Group stage

Statistics

Appearances and goals

|-
! colspan=14 ; text-align:center| Player(s) who left the club but had featured this season

|}

References

2019
2019
Kelantan
Kelantan F.C.